NHN Corp. is a South Korean IT company that started its business as a game company called Hangame in 1999. Currently its main businesses can be categorized as Cloud, Fin-Tech (cross-border e-commerce, payment), Entertainment (game, webtoon, music) and Advertisement. NHN has been focusing on Cloud service since 2014. It launched a comprehensive cloud solution brand called TOAST Cloud in 2014 and built its own IDC center in 2015 for the secure foundation of cloud solution business. Targeting both the corporate and individual clients, TOAST Cloud provides all sorts of cloud services including SaaS, PaaS and Iaas.

History 

It was founded in December 1999 under the name Hangame Communications, Inc. In July 2000, Hangame Communications officially merged with South Korea's largest search engine company, Naver. Upon the merger, the name of the company was changed to "Next Human Network", or NHN, although the two divisions continue to operate under their original brand names. On 1 August 2013 NHN was re-split into NHN Entertainment Corporation and Naver Corporation for strategic reasons. On 1 April 2019, the company name was changed to NHN again.

Games

Studios and subsidiaries 
NHN Bigfoot
NHN PixelCube
NHN Japan Corporation
NHN Global
NHN Singapore
NHN Investment
NHN Bugs Corporation (formerly Neowiz Internet Corporation, acquired from Neowiz Holdings in 2015), which trades under the Bugs! Brand (often stylized as SUPER SOUND Bugs!) held a 15% share of South Korea's music streaming market at the end of 2016, according to an IFPI survey of Internet users.
JPlanet Entertainment (formerly JJ Holic Media)
How Entertainment

References 
Specific

General

Software companies of South Korea
Mass media in Seongnam